Baron  was a statesman and diplomat in Meiji period Japan.

Biography 
Nishi was from a samurai family of the Satsuma Domain (present-day Kagoshima Prefecture). After the Meiji Restoration, he joined the Ministry of Foreign Affairs of the new Meiji government, and was sent as a student to study the Russian language in St Petersburg, Russia in 1870. From 1870-1873, he traveled extensively through Central Asia, visiting Bukhara, Samarkand, Tashkent, Ürümqi and other areas of Xinjiang. After serving as First Secretary at the Japanese legation in Paris, France in 1874, he returned to Japan.

In June 1886, he was appointed council-general of the Japanese legation to Russia, Sweden and Norway and was elevated in rank to danshaku (baron) under the kazoku peerage system. In August 1896, he became ambassador to Russia. In March 1897, he was appointed to the Privy Council.

From November 6, 1897, to January 12, 1898, Nishi served as Foreign Minister under the 2nd Matsukata administration and again as Foreign Minister from  January 12, 1898 to June 30, 1898, under the 3rd Itō administration.  He negotiated the "Third Russo-Japanese Agreement" (the Nishi–Rosen Agreement) on April 25, 1898, in which Russia acknowledged Japan's supremacy in Korea in exchange for Japan's acknowledgement of Russia's sphere of interest in Manchuria.  In October 1899, he was appointed ambassador to Qing dynasty China, and was at the Japanese legation in Beijing during the Boxer Rebellion.

In December 1899, he was awarded the Order of the Rising Sun, 1st class.

He was the father of Takeichi Nishi, an Imperial Japanese Army cavalry officer who won a gold medal in the 1932 Summer Olympics and died in the Battle of Iwo Jima.

References 
 Beasley, W.G. Japanese Imperialism 1894-1945. Oxford University Press. 
 Cortazzi, Hugh. Britain and Japan (Japan Library Biographical Portraits). RoutledgeCurzon (2003). 
 Paine, S.C.M. The Sino-Japanese War of 1894-1895: Perceptions, Power, and Primacy. Cambridge University Press (2002). 

1847 births
1912 deaths
Japanese diplomats
Foreign ministers of Japan
Japanese people of the Boxer Rebellion
Kazoku
People from Satsuma Domain
People of Meiji-period Japan
Shimazu retainers
People from Kagoshima